Leonard or Len Smith may refer to:

Sports
Len Smith (rugby league) (1911–2000), rugby league footballer of the 1930s for England, and Hunslet
Leonard Smith (American football) (born 1960), American footballer for Buffalo Bills and St. Louis/Phoenix Cardinals
Len Smith (footballer, born 1882) (1882–1943), Australian rules footballer for South Melbourne and cricketer
Len Smith (footballer, born 1912) (1912–1967), Australian rules footballer and coach
Len Smith (footballer, born 1913) (1913–1972), Australian rules footballer for North Melbourne
Len Smith (rugby) (1918–2000), rugby union and rugby league footballer of the 1930-40s for Australia, New South Wales, Eastern Suburbs and Newtown
Len Smith (swimmer) (1906–1998), New Zealand swimmer
Len Smith (American football) (1896–1944), American football player

Others
Leonard B. Smith (1915–2006), American pilot
Leonard B. Smith (musician), American cornet soloist, conductor and composer
Leonard N. Smith (born 1961), pastor
Leonard Smith (cinematographer) (1892–1947), American cinematographer
Leonard P. Smith (1814–1886), mayor of Seattle
Len Smith (trade unionist) (1879–1964), British trade unionist
Leonard V. Smith, American military historian